Deprogramming is a controversial tactic that attempts to help someone who has "strongly held convictions," often coming from cults or New Religious Movements (NRM). Deprogramming aims to assist a person who holds a controversial or restrictive belief system in changing those beliefs and severing connections to the associated group (religious, political, economic, or social) which created and controls that belief system.

Some methods and practices of people who have deprogrammed (deprogrammers) have involved kidnapping, false imprisonment, and coercion, which have sometimes resulted in criminal convictions. Some deprogramming regimens are specifically designed for individuals taken against their will, which has led to controversies over freedom of religion, kidnapping, and civil rights, as well as the use of violence, which is sometimes involved.

Background
The deprogramming that has been practiced over the last half century has typically been commissioned by a person's relatives (often parents of adult children) who objected to the subject's membership in an organization or group. It has been compared to exorcisms in both methodology and manifestation, and the process sometimes has been performed with tacit support of law enforcement and judicial officials. In response to a burgeoning number of new religious movements in the 1970s in the United States, the "father of deprogramming", Ted Patrick, introduced many of these techniques to a wider audience as a means to combat cults. Since then, deprogrammings have been carried out "by the thousands". For example, various atrocity stories served as justification for deprogramming of Unification Church members in the United States.

The various methods of deprogramming and autonomy rights of adults has made deprogramming a controversial practice. Some critics of cults and NRMs have denounced deprogramming based on legal and ethical grounds. A similar method to aide someone in leaving a NRM without force is referred to variously as "exit counselling or cult intervention". Sometimes the word deprogramming is used in a wider (and/or ironic or humorous) sense, to mean the freeing of someone (often oneself) from any previously uncritically assimilated idea. According to Carol Giambalvo, "exit counsellors are usually former cult members themselves".

Various academics have commented on the practice. For example, as defined by James T. Richardson, Professor of Sociology and Judicial Studies and Director of the Grant Sawyer Center for Justice Studies, deprogramming is a "private, self-help process whereby participants in unpopular new religious movements (NRMs) were forcibly removed from the group, incarcerated, and put through radical resocialization processes that were supposed to result in their agreeing to leave the group." Law professor Douglas Laycock, author of Religious Liberty: The Free Exercise Clause, wrote:

Beginning in the 1970s, many parents responded to the initial conversion with "deprogramming." The essence of deprogramming was to physically abduct the convert, isolate him and physically restrain him, and barrage him with continuous arguments and attacks against his new religion, threatening to hold him forever until he agreed to leave it.

Shawn McAllister writing in the Thurgood Marshall Law Review quotes John LeMoult, who described practices of deprogramming as being "seized, held against his will, subjected to mental, emotional, and even physical pressures until he renounces his beliefs." LeMoult made the comparison of the break of will and subsequent remorse and "wish to return to their previous position of firm resistance" depicted in The Rape of the Mind by J. Meerloo, to the testimony of the prisoners of war survivors of Nazi interrogation.

Procedures 
There has never been a standard procedure among deprogrammers; descriptions in anecdotal reports, studies, and interviews with former deprogrammers vary greatly. Deprogrammers generally operate on the presumption that the people they are paid to extract from religious organizations are victims of mind control (or brainwashing).

Ted Patrick, one of the pioneers of deprogramming, used a confrontational method, enlisting psychiatrists and psychologists to assist him in the deprogramming process. Patrick was tried and convicted of multiple felonies related to kidnapping and false imprisonment of deprogramming subjects.

Sylvia Buford, an associate of Ted Patrick who has assisted him on many deprogrammings, described five stages of deprogramming:
Discredit the figure of authority, the cult leader
Present contradictions (ideology versus reality); "How can he preach love when he exploits people?" is an example.
The breaking point: when a subject begins to listen to the deprogrammer; when reality begins to take precedence over ideology.
Self-expression: when the subject begins to open up and voice gripes against the cult.
Identification and transference: when the subject begins to identify with the deprogrammers, even starts to think as an opponent of the cult rather than as a member.

Violence 

The deprogramming accounts vary widely regarding the use of force, with the most dramatic accounts coming from deprogrammed people who returned to the group.

Steven Hassan in his book Releasing the Bonds spoke against coercive deprogramming methods using force or threats.

Sociologist Eileen Barker wrote thatAlthough the deprogramming has become less violent in the course of time... Numerous testimonies by those who were subjected to a deprogramming describe how they were threatened with a gun, beaten, denied sleep and food and/or sexually assaulted. But one does not have to rely on the victims for stories of violence: Ted Patrick, one of the most notorious deprogrammers used by CAGs [cult-awareness groups] (who has spent several terms in prison for his exploits) openly boasts about some of the violence he employed; in November 1987, Cyril Vosper, a committee member of the British CAG, FAIR, was convicted in Munich of "causing bodily harm" in the course of one of his many deprogramming attempts; and a number of similar convictions are on record for prominent members of CAGs elsewhere.In 1978, John E. LeMoult published in the Fordham Law Review thatDeprogrammers are people who, at the request of a parent or other close relative, will have a member of a religious sect seized, then hold him against his will and subject him to mental, emotional, and even physical pressures until he renounces his religious beliefs. Deprogrammers usually work for a fee, which may easily run as high as [US]$25,000.

The deprogramming process begins with abduction. Often strong men muscle the subject into a car and take him to a place where he is cut off from everyone but his captors. He may be held against his will for upward of three weeks. Frequently, however, the initial deprogramming only last a few days. The subject's sleep is limited and he is told that he will not be released until his beliefs meet his captors' approval. Members of the deprogramming group, as well as members of the family, come into the room where the victim is held and barrage him with questions and denunciations until he recants his newly found religious beliefs.Exit counselor Carol Giambalvo writes in the 1998 text "From Deprogramming to Thought Reform Consultation":It was believed that the hold of the brainwashing over the cognitive processes of a cult member needed to be broken – or "snapped" as some termed it – by means that would shock or frighten the cultist into thinking again. For that reason in some cases cult leader's pictures were burned or there were highly confrontational interactions between deprogrammers and cultist. What was often sought was an emotional response to the information, the shock, the fear, and the confrontation. There are horror stories – promoted most vehemently by the cults themselves – about restraint, beatings, and even rape. And we have to admit that we have met former members who have related to us their deprogramming experience – several of handcuffs, weapons wielded and sexual abuse. But thankfully, these are in the minority – and in our minds, never justified. Nevertheless, deprogramming helped to free many individuals held captive to destructive cults at a time when other alternatives did not seem viable.

Effectiveness and harm
Alan W. Gomes (chairman of the department of theology at Talbot School of Theology, Biola University) in his 1995 book Unmasking the Cults reports:While advocates of the deprogramming position have claimed high rates of success, studies show that natural attrition rates actually are higher than the success rate achieved through deprogramming.The Dialog Center International (DCI) a major Christian counter-cult organization founded in 1973 by a Danish professor of missiology and ecumenical theology, Johannes Aagaard, rejects deprogramming, believing that it is counterproductive, ineffective, and can harm the relationship between a cult member and concerned family members.

Professor of psychiatry Saul V. Levine suggests that it is doubtful that deprogramming helps many people and goes on to say that it actually causes harm to the victim by very nature of the deprogramming. For deprogramming to work, the victim must be convinced that they joined a religious group against their will. They then must renounce responsibility and accept that in some mysterious way that their minds were controlled. He argues that deprogramming destroys a person's identity and is likely to create permanent anxiety about freedom of choice and leave the deprogrammed subject dependent upon the guidance and advice of others.

Government

Deprogramming activities sometimes fall outside of the law. Government agencies have at times been aware and have taken part in deprogramming to enforce official views of "correct" beliefs and behaviors. This can involve "vigorous, even violent, efforts to dissuade people from participating in groups deemed unacceptable to the government" and have been "given legal sanction by the passage of laws that make illegal the activities or even the beliefs of the unpopular movement or group being targeted".

In the 1980s in the United States, namely in New York (Deprogramming Bill, 1981), Kansas (Deprogramming Bill, 1982), and Nebraska (conservatorship legislation for 1985), lawmakers unsuccessfully attempted to legalize involuntary deprogramming.

Controversy and related issues

In the United States, from the mid-1970s and throughout the 1980s mind control was a widely accepted theory in public opinion, and the vast majority of newspaper and magazine accounts of deprogrammings assumed that recruits' relatives were well justified to seek conservatorships and to hire deprogrammers.

One aspect that gradually became disturbing from a civil rights point of view, was that relatives would use deception or other ethically questionable methods—even kidnapping—to get the recruit into deprogrammers' hands, without allowing the person any recourse to a lawyer or psychiatrist of their own choosing. Previously, there would be a sanity hearing first, and only then a commitment to an asylum or involuntary therapy. But with deprogramming, judges routinely granted parents legal authority over their adult children without a hearing.

Critics contend that deprogramming and exit counseling begin with a false premise. Lawyers for some groups who have lost members due to deprogramming, as well as some civil liberties advocates, sociologists and psychologists, argue that it is not the religious groups but rather the deprogrammers who are the ones who deceive and manipulate people.

During the 1990s, deprogrammer Rick Ross was sued by Jason Scott, a former member of a Pentecostal group called the Life Tabernacle Church, after an unsuccessful deprogramming attempt. In 1995, the jury awarded Scott US$875,000 in compensatory damages and US$2,500,000 in punitive damages against Ross, which were later settled for US$5,000 and 200 hours of services. More significantly, the jury also found that the leading anti-cult group known as the Cult Awareness Network (CAN) was a co-conspirator in the crime and fined CAN around US$1,000,000 in punitive damages, forcing the group into bankruptcy. This case is often seen as effectively closing the door on the practice of involuntary deprogramming in the United States.

Referral and kickback system
Anti-cult groups play a central role in maintaining the underground network of communications, referrals, transportation, and housing necessary for continued deprogramming.

Groups such as the Cult Awareness Network operated a referral scheme (NARDEC) in which they would refer people to deprogrammers in return for a "kickback" in the form of a donation or as a commission. Deprogrammers such as Rick Alan Ross, Steven Hassan and Carol Giambalvo were among the CAN-referred deprogrammers.

Historical examples

Exit counseling
Deprogramming and exit counseling, sometimes seen as one and the same, are distinct approaches to convincing a person to leave a cult. During exit counseling, a subject has the ability to leave at any time and so the exit counselor focuses on building rapport rather than persuading the subject that the cult is a negative influence.

Deprogramming entails coercion and confinement costs typically rise to US$10,000 or more, mainly due to the expense of a security team. Exit counseling, by contrast, typically costs US$2,000 to US$4,000 for a three- to five-day intervention, although cases requiring extensive research of little-known groups can cost much more (estimated in 1993). Deprogramming, especially when it fails, also entails considerable legal and psychological risk (for example, a permanent alienation of the subject from his or her family). The psychological and legal risks in exit counseling are significantly reduced. Although deprogrammers do prepare families for the process, exit counselors tend to work with them directly, expecting those requesting the intervention to contribute more to the process; that is, exit counseling requires that families establish a reasonable and respectful level of communication with their loved one before the program itself can begin. Because deprogramming relies on coercion, which is illegal except in the case of conservatorship and is generally viewed as unethical, deprogrammers' critiques of the unethical practices of cults tend to be less credible to the subject than the arguments of exit counselors.

Steven Hassan, author of the book Combatting Cult Mind Control, states that he took part in a number of deprogrammings in the late 1970s, and has spoken out against them since 1980. Hassan states that he has not participated in any deprogrammings since then, although on page 114 of Combatting, Hassan states that deprogrammings should be kept as a last resort if all other attempts fail to transform the individual. Hassan is one of the major proponents of exit counseling as a form of intercession, and he refers to his method as "strategic intervention therapy".

In popular culture
 Burns' Heir, a 1994 episode of The Simpsons
 Faults, a 2014 drama movie about deprogramming
 Holy Smoke!, a 1999 movie based on the book with the same name
 Ticket to Heaven, a 1981 movie about deprogramming
 Split Image, a 1982 movie about deprogramming 
 Deprogrammed, a 2015 Canadian documentary

See also
Anti-cult movement
Brainwashing
Carol Giambalvo
Cyril Vosper
Martin Faiers
Ted Patrick
Steven Hassan

Reference

Human rights abuses
Disengagement from religion
Anti-cult terms and concepts